Estelle Axton (September 11, 1918 – February 24, 2004) was an American record executive and co-founder of Stax Records, along with her brother Jim Stewart.

Biography
Born in Middleton, Tennessee, Estelle Stewart grew up on a farm.  She moved to Memphis as a school teacher, married Everett Axton, and was working in a bank when, in 1958, her brother Jim Stewart asked for help to develop Satellite Records, which he had set up to issue recordings of local country and rockabilly artists.  She convinced her husband that they should remortgage their house and, in 1959, joined Satellite as an equal partner. The following year, Axton and Stewart turned the Capitol Theatre, in a black Memphis neighborhood, into a recording studio and record shop, and began making hit records with predominantly black artists.

Satellite was forced to change its name in 1961 after it was discovered that a Los Angeles label already owned the title, and it changed its name to Stax, taking its name from Axton and Stewart's surnames: Jim Stewart and Estelle Axton. Axton was actively involved with selecting and developing the artists on the label, who included Rufus Thomas, Otis Redding, Booker T & the MGs, and Isaac Hayes. 

She sold her interest in the company in 1970. After a noncompete agreement expired, Axton formed Fretone Records whose biggest hit, "Disco Duck", by Rick Dees, was licensed for distribution by RSO Records.

In December 2006, the Recording Academy announced that Axton would be honored with a Trustee's Award as part of the upcoming Grammys.

Axton was the founder of the Memphis Songwriters Association in 1973, which was formed to foster the education and advancement of local songwriters. There was a focus on the development of the songwriting craft with the intention of producing commercially viable songs and improving performance skills. The association has consecutively maintained membership for over 35 years. The formation of the Memphis Songwriters Association helped to motivate many local songwriters and singer-songwriters to publish their original material. Some of these songs and artists met with some surprising success. Unfortunately, historical records are fragmented and scarce; however, there are a number of MSA alumni that could still tell their stories. As of 2015, the Memphis Songwriters Association is still actively holding meetings and events.

Axton went on, with her friend Cordell Jackson, the founder of Moon Records, to work with the Music Industries of Memphis, later named the Memphis Music Association, to assist in the development of Memphis music as a global force once again. Their collaboration and guidance helped launch the first Memphis Demo Derby, the brainchild of the PR director Brett Hamilton, which was designed to present and showcase Memphis musical talent to A&R reps, studio heads, producers and the like. The event was such a huge success, it continued for several years. Joe Savarin, the founder of the Handy Awards, and Wanda Freeman of Tenant Laboratories lent a hand in spite of public opposition. The MMA was the umbrella organization for all Memphis music and still exists today.

In 2012, Axton was inducted into the Memphis Music Hall of Fame, along with her brother and Stax co-founder Jim Stewart.

Axton died on February 24, 2004, at Saint Francis Hospital hospice in Memphis. She was buried at Forest Hill Cemetery East in Memphis.

See also
Packy Axton

Notes

External links 
 Memphis Songwriters Association website
 http://www.history-of-rock.com/stax_records.htm
 
 
  Obituary

1918 births
2004 deaths
American music industry executives
American women record producers
People from Middleton, Tennessee
Stax Records